Khvor Rural District is in the Central District of Khusf County, South Khorasan province, Iran. Prior to the 2016 National Census, its constituent villages were a part of the former Khusf District of Birjand County. At the most recent census of 2016, the population of the rural district was 2,476 in 643 households, by which time the district had been separated from the county and Khusf County established with two new districts. The largest of its 28 villages was Khvor, with 1,010 people in 175 households.

References 

Khusf County

Rural Districts of South Khorasan Province

Populated places in South Khorasan Province

Populated places in Khusf County

fa:دهستان خور